Lugo is a city in Galicia, Spain.

Lugo may also refer to:

Places

Spain
Lugo (province), a province in Galicia, Spain
Lugo (comarca), a comarca in the province of Lugo, Galicia, Spain
Lugo (Congress of Deputies constituency), represents the province of Lugo in the Spanish congress
Lugo (Senate constituency), represents the province of Lugo in the Spanish senate
Lugo (Parliament of Galicia constituency), represents the province of Lugo in the Galician parliament

Elsewhere
Lugo, Emilia-Romagna, a town and comune in the province of Ravenna, Emilia-Romagna, Italy
Lugo di Vicenza, a town and comune in the province of Vicenza, Veneto, Italy
Lugo-di-Nazza, a commune in the Haute-Corse department on the island of Corsica, France.
Lugo, California, a hamlet in the U.S State of California

People
Lugo (surname), includes a list of notable people surnamed Lugo or de Lugo

Other
CD Lugo, football team in the Spanish city

See also
De Lugo (disambiguation)